Mount Pleasant is a British comedy-drama which first aired on Sky 1 on 24 August 2011. The show moved to Sky Living in 2012, before moving back to Sky 1 in 2015. The show is about the day-to-day life of the main character Lisa, her husband, her dad, as well as neighbours and colleagues. Each episode is an hour long (including adverts) and takes place in various locations, including the cul-de-sac Lisa lives in, her workplace, local pub The Dog and Dart, and more.

Series overview

Episodes

Series 1 (2011)

Series 2 (2012)

Christmas special (2012)

Series 3 (2013)

Series 4 (2014)

Series 5 (2015)

Series 6 (2016)

Finale (2017)
In March 2017, it was announced that Mount Pleasant would return for a special final episode later that year. The episode is 90 minutes long and is to revolve around Lisa and Dan's wedding anniversary, which will not be 'plain-sailing'.

References

External links
 List of 

Lists of British sitcom episodes